The ladies' individual skating event was held as part of the figure skating at the 1928 Winter Olympics. It was the fourth appearance of the event, which had previously been held at the Summer Olympics in 1908 and 1920 and was also part of the first Winter Games in 1924. The competition was held from Thursday, 16 February to Saturday, 18 February 1928. Twenty figure skaters from eight nations competed.

Results

Referee:
  Walter Jakobsson

Judges:
  Oscar Kolderup
  Francis Pigueron
  Thomas D. Richardson
  Fernand de Montigny
  Henry W. Howe
  Otto Schöning
  Walter Muller

References

External links
 Official Olympic Report
 sports-reference
 

Figure skating at the 1928 Winter Olympics
1928 in figure skating
Alp
Oly